Refusal to serve in a public office is an offence under the common law of England and Wales. The offence is currently regarded as obsolete, and it may extend only to the appointment of high sheriffs. As a common law offence, it is tried on indictment and can be punished by an unlimited fine and/or period of imprisonment.

Members of the House of Commons of the United Kingdom or candidates for election are exempt from the requirement to accept public office where it would cause them to be disqualified from being MPs, although this exemption does not extend to requirements to serve in the armed forces.

References

Crimes
Common law offences in England and Wales
English criminal law